Paul Joseph Raymond Gayrard (3 September 1807 – 1855) was a French sculptor born in Clermont-Ferrand, France.
  
He studied at an early age under his sculptor/engraver father Raymond Gayrard, and was a student of François Rude as well as David d'Angers.

Gayrard first exhibited his works at the Salon in 1827 and continued to submit works throughout his lifetime winning a Second class medal in 1834 and a First Class Medal in 1846 and 1848. His last recorded exhibit was in 1855. He was very successful among the more wealthy of French high society and executed many busts of the more notables of the day, but had a considerable talent for animal modeling. His known bronze animal models date from the years 1846 until 1848 with his powerful plaster of a 'Harness Horse' exhibited at the Salon in 1847 and submitted again in 1848 in bronze. Also in 1848 his bronze of a 'Reclining Deerhound', thought to be first viewed when in plaster at the Salon in 1846, was particularly striking. One of his other animals groups titled 'The Monkey Steeplechase' is a rather humorous and whimsical subject done in a similar vain to Christophe Fratin's bronzes of humanized animals.

His monumental works include the four evangelists for the Sainte Clotide Basilica in Paris.

1807 births
1855 deaths
Artists from Clermont-Ferrand
Animal artists
19th-century French sculptors
French male sculptors
19th-century French painters
French male painters
19th-century French male artists